Rafiq Bhatia (born 21 August 1987) is an American musician, composer, guitarist, and producer. He is the guitarist and fellow producer of the American experimental rock band Son Lux, having been a touring member prior.

As a solo artist, he has recorded three solo albums Yes it Will (2012), Strata (2012), and Breaking English (2018). Bhatia has also worked with musicians Olga Bell, Sam Dew, Dave Douglas, Marcus Gilmore, Billy Hart, Heems, Helado Negro, Vijay Iyer, Glenn Kotche, Valgeir Sigurðsson, Moses Sumney, and David Virelles.

Career
A first-generation American of East African Indian descent, Bhatia was born in Hickory, North Carolina and grew up in Raleigh. His interest in music began with two inspirations: his grandfather’s reedy, a capella renditions of Ginans, and listening to gangster rap on the radio. He began playing guitar in high school.

After graduating from Oberlin College with a degree in neuroscience and economics, in 2010 Bhatia moved to Brooklyn, where he has remained. The composer-guitarist's first two albums, Strata and Yes It Will, were described as "transcending real sound in real time with the unexpected,"  and as "approximating life in the information age … profuse, immersive and immense."

In 2014, Bhatia and drummer Ian Chang became members of Son Lux, expanding the former solo project of Ryan Lott into a trio. They have since been heralded as "the world's most lethal band", and described as "thrilling... an ideal synthesis of contemporary forms". In the past few years, Son Lux has written, recorded, and released the album Bones and its companion EP Stranger Forms and have given over 300 performances in North America, Europe, and Asia.

Bhatia has recorded with Lorde, Sufjan Stevens, Heems, and David Virelles, and on the soundtracks to the films The Disappearance of Eleanor Rigby, Air, and Afflicted. He has also recorded with members of the chamber ensembles International Contemporary Ensemble, JACK Quartet, and Alarm Will Sound.

Discography

As Rafiq Bhatia
 Strata EP (2012) – digital 
 Yes It Will (2012) – 12" vinyl, CD, digital
 Breaking English (2018) – 12" vinyl, CD, digital

With Son Lux
 Lanterns (2013) – 12" vinyl, CD, digital – Joyful Noise
 Alternate Worlds (2013) – 12" vinyl, digital – Joyful Noise
 Bones (2015) – 12" vinyl, CD, digital – Glassnote
 Stranger Forms (2016) – digital – Glassnote
 Brighter Wounds (2018) – digital – City Slang

With other artists
 Sisyphus, Sisyphus (2013) – 2x12" vinyl, digital – Joyful Noise/Asthmatic Kitty
 Tecla, We Are The Lucky Ones (2013) – CD, digital – Mayimba Music/RCA
 Heems, Eat Pray Thug (2015) – 12" vinyl, CD, digital – Megaforce
 David Virelles, Antenna (2016) – 7" vinyl, digital – ECM

Soundtracks
 Son Lux, Original Music From and Inspired By: The Disappearance of Eleanor Rigby (Original Motion Picture Soundtrack) (2014) – digital – Glassnote
 Edo Van Breemen – AIR (Original Motion Picture Score) (2015) – LP, CD, digital – Nettwerk

References

External links 
 

1987 births
Living people
21st-century American guitarists
American people of Indian descent